On a Day Like Today is the eighth studio album by Canadian singer-songwriter Bryan Adams, released on October 27, 1998.

Singles
"On a Day Like Today" was the first single released. It reached number thirteen in the UK and number one on the Canadian Singles Chart. Follow-up single "When You're Gone", featuring Melanie C, reached number three in the UK, and was in the top-ten for ten weeks, while peaking at number eleven in Canada. "Cloud Number Nine" reached number six in the UK and number seven in Canada.

Critical reception

On a Day Like Today received mixed reviews from critics. Writing for Entertainment Weekly, Tom Lanham gave the album a B+ rating, stating that "Adams started searching for that perfect balance of mature grace and useful guitar grind".

However, William Ruhlmann of AllMusic gave the album two-out-of-five stars, claiming that "Adams simply had no contemporary audience left, and this was not the record to rebuild his career. It was defiantly bereft of ballads, nothing to break on the AC chart, and even if his rock audience had been listening, there was nothing here to rank with his earlier signature hits".

Commercial performance
On a Day Like Today was a success around the world, peaking at number three in Canada, and number eleven in the UK. However at the time in the U.S. market, it became the first of Adams' albums since 1983's Cuts Like a Knife not to obtain a platinum sales certification. According to AllMusic, the record company didn't do a lot of advertising for album, as Adams and this album got caught when his record company sold his recording contract to rap label Interscope, who in turn did very little in the USA to promote it.

Track listing

Charts

Weekly charts

Year-end charts

Certifications

Personnel 
 Bryan Adams – vocals, Wurlitzer electric piano, Mellotron, guitars, bass, arrangements, string arrangements 
 Robbie Buchanan – keyboards 
 Mike Gillies – programming
 Vincent Jones – Hammond organ
 Dave Pickell – acoustic piano, Hammond organ
 Phil Western – keyboards, programming 
 Olle Romo – programming 
 Keith Scott – guitars, six-string bass
 Phil Thornalley – guitars, bass, string arrangements (4)
 Dave Taylor – bass 
 Mickey Curry – drums
 Danny Cummings – percussion
 Bob Buckley – string arrangements
 David Munday – string arrangements (4)
 Vancouver Orchestra – strings 
 Melanie C – vocals (8)

Production 
 Bryan Adams – producer, package design, photography 
 Bob Rock – producer (1, 2, 3, 5-9, 11, 12, 14)
 Phil Thornalley – producer (4), additional recording
 Phil Western – producer (10), additional recording 
 Randy Staub – recording 
 Bob Clearmountain – mixing 
 Dean Maher – additional recording, mix assistant
 Ron Obvious – technical engineer 
 Bob Ludwig – mastering 
 Gateway Mastering (Portland, Maine) – mastering location 
 Sandy Brummels – art coordinator 
 Glen Ross – package design

References 

1998 albums
A&M Records albums
Albums produced by Bob Rock
Albums recorded at The Warehouse Studio
Bryan Adams albums